You Can't See 'Round Corners may refer to:
 You Can't See 'Round Corners (novel), a 1947 novel by Jon Cleary
 You Can't See 'Round Corners (TV series), a 1967 Australian TV series, based on the novel
 You Can't See 'round Corners, a 1969 Australian film, a version of the TV series